Polona Klemenčič (born 16 April 1997) is an Slovenian biathlete. She competed at the 2022 Winter Olympics, in Mixed relay, Women's pursuit, Women's individual, and Women's sprint.

She competed at the Biathlon World Championships 2019, Biathlon World Championships 2020, and Biathlon World Championships 2021.

References

External links 
 

1997 births
Living people
Slovenian female biathletes
Place of birth missing (living people)
Olympic biathletes of Slovenia
Biathletes at the 2022 Winter Olympics
21st-century Slovenian women